Han Geng (Chinese: 韩庚; Pinyin: Hán Gēng) (born February 9, 1984) is a Chinese Mandopop singer and actor. He started his career in 2001, when he was chosen by S.M. Entertainment to become a member of South Korean boy band Super Junior, which debuted in 2005. He later became the leader of its sub-group Super Junior-M in 2008. On December 21, 2009, Han filed a lawsuit against SME to terminate his contract. He has since returned to China to pursue a solo career. On September 27, 2011, Han's departure from SM Entertainment was made official as both parties came to a mutual agreement.

For his various contributions to the spread of Chinese culture, Han was chosen as a torch bearer for the 2008 Beijing Olympics. He later also became an ambassador for the 2010 Shanghai Expo and the 2010 Asian Games. In late 2012, Han started to gain international attention and won the 2012 MTV Europe Music Awards' "Best Worldwide Act" and Nickelodeon's 2013 Kids' Choice Awards' "Favorite Asian Act".

Early life 
Han is of ethnic Nanai descent from Northeast China, and was born in Mudanjiang, Heilongjiang, China.
He attended Guang Hua Elementary School from 1990 to 1996.

At age 12, Han was accepted into the dance department at the Central University for Nationalities in Beijing, and left his family and his hometown in the Northeastern part of China to pursue studies in dance. During his years at the university, he mastered all 56 types of traditional dances from China's 56 ethnic groups, received training in ballet and martial arts, and performed in many countries including the United States and Russia.

In 1999, as a representative of the Nanai ethnic group, Han participated in China's anniversary parade.

Career

Pre-debut
In December 2001, Han signed up for the H.O.T. CHINA Audition Casting, a casting audition that was hosted by S.M. Entertainment.

After the audition, Han began to work briefly as a cameo actor in short low-budget Chinese films to earn a salary before entering college. In late August 2002, Han was notified that he had been accepted into S.M. Entertainment. After Han's graduation at the Central University for Nationalities, he was sent to Korea and received private lessons in singing, dancing, and acting, as well as learning the Korean language.

2005–09: Super Junior, Super Junior-M and activities in China

On February 6, 2005, Han was officially announced to be part of the all-boy rotational musical group Super Junior as a member of its first generation, Super Junior 05.

On March 20, 2008, Han was announced to be one of the torch bearers for the 2008 Beijing Olympics. He also sung the Beijing Olympic theme song "Beijing Welcomes You".

On April 8, 2008, Super Junior's third subgroup Super Junior-M made its debut in China, with Han as the leader of the group. The subgroup released their first Chinese-language studio album, Me, on May 2, 2008.

In 2009, Han starred in CCTV's 12-episode drama Stage of Youth. This marks his acting debut.

On December 21, 2009, Han filed for contract termination from SM Entertainment and ceased activities with both Super Junior and Super Junior-M.

2010–12: Solo debut
On July 27, 2010, Han launched his first album The Heart of Geng. The album contained ten tracks, including the title song "My Logo", which was produced by American producer Craig Williams and Dutch producer Rene Van Verseveld. Travis Payne and Stacey Walker, along with Michael Jackson's "This Is It" dancers participated in creating the choreography for the song. The Heart of Geng topped various major music charts throughout Asia, and sold more than 350,000 copies within only 2 months after its release. A special celebratory version of the album was released on October 1 with a limited number of 20,000 copies. Han also held his first two solo concerts in Beijing on July 17 and 18.

Han made his debut on the big screen in the US-Chinese collaboration action film My Kingdom. The film is directed by Gao Xiaosong, produced by Andre Morgan and features action directing by Sammo Hung. Han also played Deng Xiaoping in the government-funded film The Founding of a Party and starred in the film The First President as Hu Han Min, the secretary of Sun Yat-Sen.

On July 19, 2012, Han released his second album Hope in the Darkness which contained singles "Wild Cursive", "Clown Mask" and "Betrayal of the Soul". Han also kicked off his "Hope in the Darkness World Tour" on July 28, 2012, at Beijing MasterCard Center.

2013–present: International recognition and acting 
On November 11, 2012, Han was announced as the winner of the MTV European Music Awards' Best Worldwide Act, earning him his first major international award.

On March 24, 2013, Han attended Nickelodeon's 2013 Kids' Choice Awards at the Galen Center in Los Angeles, where he won the Favorite Asian Act award.

Han was then cast in Zhao Wei’s directorial debut So Young. The film was released on April 26, 2013, and became a major success at the Chinese box office, grossing over 700 million yuan (US$115 million). The same year, he was cast in Chinese-French film Seek McCartney, about a romance that centers on a relationship between two gay men. The film is China's first gay film and premiered in Cannes in 2014.

In 2014, Han starred in romantic comedy film Ex-Files, which went on to become one of the most successful romantic comedy series. Han was praised for his comedic timing and acting performance. The same year, he made a cameo appearance in the Hollywood blockbuster Transformers: Age of Extinction.

On May 27, 2014, Han won the World's Best Male Artist award at the World Music Awards' World's Best Male Artist. He was also the first Chinese singer to be invited to perform for the World Music Awards.

In 2015, Han starred alongside Fan Bingbing in the erotic romance film Ever Since We Love, adapted from the novel Everything Grows by Feng Tang.
In 2016, Han starred in the South Korean-Chinese co-production film Sweet Sixteen, a bitter coming-of-age romance. The same year, he starred in fantasy comedy film A Chinese Odyssey Part Three directed by Jeffery Lau, playing the titular role of Sun Wukong. Han also competed on and won the 2nd season of The Amazing Race with teammate Wu Xin.

On November 30, 2015, Han released his third album San Geng. He announced that this would be his final album release, and he will focus on acting in the future.

In 2016, Han announced that he will be starring in the science fiction drama Hard Memory. He also acts as the executive producer of the series.

In 2017, Han was cast in the fantasy suspense film The Great Detective (film). In July, he featured in the documentary film The Founding of an Army, playing the role of Zhang Xueliang. The same month, he was cast in the film adaptation of popular video game Dynasty Warriors, playing the role of Guan Yu. In December, Han reprised his role as Meng Yun in the third installment of the Ex-file franchise.

In 2018, Han starred in hacker-themed thriller Reborn. He also participated as a captain on the first season of the hip hop show, Street Dance of China.

In 2019, he returned as a captain for Street Dance of China 2.

In 2020, Han starred in modern romance drama Still Not Enough. 

Han participated in the period drama series “Legacy” which will premiere exclusively on WarnerMedia’s regional streaming service HBO Go at an unspecified date later in 2021. “Legacy” is a 1920s-set drama that chronicles the lives of the wealthy Yi family and three sisters who vie to inherit their father’s shopping mall business. In a time of upheaval and uncertainty, the three sisters set aside their differences to keep the business afloat and save their family. That same year he was a captain for Street Dance of China 4.

In 2022, he returned for his 4th season of Street Dance of China as a captain once again in Street Dance of China 5.

Philanthropy
In 2013, Han participated in MTV EXIT's anti-human trafficking campaign as a special host for Human Traffic: China, a 36-minute documentary aimed at raising awareness to help prevent human trafficking in China. The documentary was produced with the support of China's Ministry of Public Security (MPS) and the United Nations Inter Agency Project on Human Trafficking (UNIAP), in partnership with the United States Agency for International Development (USAID), the Australian Agency for International Development (AusAID), Walk Free, and the Association of Southeast Asian Nations (ASEAN).

Personal life and other activities
In 2013, Han launched his own customized phone brand, known as the "Geng Phone."

On May 16, 2014, Han appeared at the New York Stock Exchange to ring the opening bell as a shareholder of Jumei International Holding Limited. Han is the first Chinese artist to ring the opening or closing bell at the NYSE as a shareholder.

On September 24, 2014, Han launched his eyewear brand "Burqa Angel".

Han Geng and actress Celina Jade married on December 31, 2019, in New Zealand. In September 2022, they welcomed their first child, a daughter.

Controversies

Performance restrictions
Before his debut, Han entered Korea with a vacation visa and had to return to China every three months to renew it. After debuting in 2005, his company obtained an E-6 (Entertainment Industry) passport, allowing him to stay for longer periods. However, a Chinese passport strictly limited his promotional activities and appearances in various broadcasting corporations in Korea. By law, a Chinese passport holder is only allowed to perform on three television stations. Han was allowed to perform on KBS and SBS, as stated by Lee Soo Man during a Harvard Korean Wave conference in early 2007. Initially, the company did not know of the procedures and was fined because of it. Before Han signed contracts with KBS and SBS, he performed on stage with a mask and a hat to hide his face on screen. Many thought Han was a backup dancer until three months later when his bandmate Kim Heechul finally revealed him to the media by publicly taking off his mask.

Despite visa restrictions, Han performed with the rest of Super Junior at the 2007 M.NET/KM Music Festival and the 2007 Golden Disk Awards. Both award ceremonies aired on channels that Han was restricted to perform on.

Lawsuit and leaving SM Entertainment
On December 21, 2009, Han filed for contract termination from his former company S.M. Entertainment, arguing that the 13-year length and structure of their exclusive contracts as well as the terms of profit distribution were unilaterally disadvantageous towards the artists and should be invalidated. Along with this, it was disclosed that because of S.M. Entertainment's refusal to give him a day off in over two years, he had developed gastritis and kidney disease.

On December 21, 2010, the Seoul Central District Court ruled in favor of Han. However, a representative of S.M. Entertainment stated that they will file an immediate appeal to reverse the decision.

As of September 27, 2011, Han and S.M. Entertainment have officially come to a mutual agreement regarding Han's contract, thus closing the case. Han will not continue his exclusive contract with SME and no longer has any legally binding connection with SME, as stated by Yue Hua Entertainment, Han's current management company.

Discography

Albums

Singles

Filmography

Film

Television series

Music video

Awards and nominations

Music awards

Film awards

Notes

References

External links

1984 births
Chinese dance musicians
Chinese expatriates in South Korea
Chinese K-pop singers
Chinese male dancers
Chinese male rappers
Chinese Mandopop singers
Japanese-language singers
Korean-language singers of China
Living people
Male actors from Heilongjiang
Minzu University of China alumni
People from Mudanjiang
Singers from Heilongjiang
Super Junior members
Super Junior-M members
Chinese male film actors
Chinese male television actors
21st-century Chinese male singers
21st-century Chinese male actors
Nanai people
MTV Europe Music Award winners
The Amazing Race contestants
Reality show winners